Enver Brandt (born September 30, 1991) is a South African rugby union player for  in the Currie Cup and the Rugby Challenge. His regular position is wing.

References

1991 births
Living people
Cheetahs (rugby union) players
Free State Cheetahs players
Griffons (rugby union) players
Griquas (rugby union) players
Rugby union players from Bellville, South Africa
Rugby union wings
South African rugby union players